Nilima Ghose (born 15 June 1935) was the first female track athlete from India to compete at the Summer Olympics, when she took part in two events at the 1952 Summer Olympics held in Helsinki, Finland.

Ghose was just 17 years old when she competed in her two events at the 1952 Summer Olympics, in the 100 metres she ran in the first heat (teammate Mary D'Souza ran in heat 9, so Ghose was first Indian female track athlete at the Olympics), she ran a time of 13.80 seconds and came last in the heat and so did not qualify for the next round. A couple of days later Ghose was back on the track competing in the 80 metres hurdles, she finished fifth nearly two seconds behind the winner of her heat Fanny Blankers-Koen.

References

External links
 

1935 births
Living people
Sportswomen from West Bengal
Athletes (track and field) at the 1952 Summer Olympics
Olympic athletes of India
Indian female sprinters
Olympic female sprinters